The 2007 NCAA Division I Field Hockey Championship was the 27th women's collegiate field hockey tournament organized by the National Collegiate Athletic Association, to determine the top college field hockey team in the United States. The North Carolina Tar Heels won their fifth championship, defeating the Penn State Nittany Lions in the final. The semifinals and championship were hosted by the University of Maryland at Maryland Field Hockey & Lacrosse Complex in College Park, Maryland.

Bracket

References 

2007
Field Hockey
2007 in women's field hockey
2007 in sports in Maryland